Mallemort is a commune in the Bouches-du-Rhône department in southern France.

Mallemort is a quiet town located on the river Durance, south of the Luberon mountain range.

Population

See also
 Communes of the Bouches-du-Rhône department

References

Communes of Bouches-du-Rhône
Bouches-du-Rhône communes articles needing translation from French Wikipedia